Curlew Island may refer to:

Curlew Island (Andaman and Nicobar Islands), India
Curlew Island (Gulf Islands), British Columbia, Canada
Curlew Island (South Australia), Australia
Curlew Island (Tasmania), Australia

See also
Curlew (disambiguation)